Louis Arthur "Skip" Bafalis (born September 28, 1929) is an American businessman and former politician who served as the U.S. representative for Florida's 10th congressional district from 1973 to 1983. A member of the Republican Party, he was the party's nominee in the 1982 Florida gubernatorial election, and previously represented district 33 in the Florida Senate from 1966 to 1970.

Early life
Bafalis was born in Boston, Massachusetts, his father was an immigrant from Greece and his maternal grandparents came from Sweden. He graduated in 1948 from Manchester Central High School in Manchester, New Hampshire, then attended until 1952 Saint Anselm College in neighboring Goffstown, New Hampshire. He was in the United States Army from 1953 to 1956, having reached the rank of captain. After military service, he moved to Florida in 1955 to work as an investment banker.

Political career
Bafalis was elected to the Florida House of Representatives in 1964 and then to the Florida Senate in 1966 and 1968. In 1970, he was an unsuccessful candidate for governor, having lost his party's nomination to Claude R. Kirk, Jr., the controversial incumbent. Kirk was subsequently unseated by the Democrat Reubin Askew of Pensacola. In that same election, U.S. Representative William C. Cramer of St. Petersburg lost the U.S. Senate race to Democrat Lawton Chiles of Lakeland. The intraparty divisions stemming from the defeats of both Kirk and Cramer set back the projected growth of the Florida Republican Party.

In 1972, Bafalis was elected to the ninety-third United States Congress (1973–1975) from a newly created district stretching from the Palm Beaches to Fort Myers. He was also elected to the four succeeding congresses and served from January 3, 1975, to January 3, 1983. During his time in Congress, Bafalis resided in Fort Myers Beach and Palm Beach.

He was not a candidate for re-election to the Ninety-eighth Congress in 1982, but was an unsuccessful gubernatorial nominee, having been defeated by the then incumbent Bob Graham, a Democrat from Miami. According to GovTrack, Bafalis missed 8 percent of the roll call votes during his years of service in Congress, but the percent of missed votes reached 80 percent in the second quarter of 1982 when he was campaigning for governor. After his congressional tenure, he worked as a governmental affairs consultant. He tried to make a comeback in 1988 when he ran in the Republican primary for Florida's 13th congressional district. Bafalis had represented much of the territory in this new district, including Fort Myers, during his initial stint in Congress. He lost in the primary runoff, however, to Lee County Commissioner Porter Goss.

Personal life
As of 2011, Bafalis resides outside Washington, D.C., in Fairfax, Virginia. He is a partner at the Arlington-based government affairs firm Alcalde & Fay. Bafalis has three children, Renee Louise Bafalis, Gregory Louis Bafalis, and Joshua Evan Bafalis. His wife is Charlotte Maria Bafalis.

References

1929 births
Living people
20th-century American politicians
American investment bankers
American people of Greek descent
American people of Swedish descent
Businesspeople from Florida
Florida state senators
Manchester Central High School alumni
Members of the Florida House of Representatives
Military personnel from Massachusetts
People from Palm Beach, Florida
Politicians from Boston
Politicians from Fairfax, Virginia
Politicians from Manchester, New Hampshire
Republican Party members of the United States House of Representatives from Florida
Saint Anselm College alumni
United States Army officers
Virginia Republicans
Members of Congress who became lobbyists